Al McDonald is a politician in Ontario, Canada, who was mayor of North Bay, Ontario from 2010 to 2022. He was previously a Progressive Conservative member of the Legislative Assembly of Ontario from 2002 to 2003, and ran unsuccessfully for the Conservative Party of Canada in the 2004 federal election.

Background
McDonald was born in Marville, France.

Politics
McDonald was politically active on North Bay City Council before entering provincial politics, serving as the deputy mayor of that city for a time. He also served on the North Bay Economic Development Commission, the North Bay Police Services Board, and other local programs.

When former Premier Mike Harris resigned as the member for Nipissing in early 2002, McDonald won the Progressive Conservative nomination to replace him. In a by-election held on May 2, 2002, he defeated Liberal candidate George Maroosis, also a city councillor, by 19 votes, as confirmed by a recount.  McDonald served as a backbench supporter of new Premier Ernie Eves.

His tenure in office was brief. The Liberals won a majority government in the provincial election of 2003, and McDonald lost his seat to Liberal candidate Monique Smith by about 3,000 votes.

In the federal election of 2004, McDonald ran for the Conservatives in the redistributed riding of Nipissing—Timiskaming, but lost to Liberal Anthony Rota by 2,253 votes.

On August 26, 2010 McDonald announced his intention to run for mayor of North Bay in the 2010 municipal election. He won 87 per cent of the vote on election day over challengers Valerie Chadbourne and Harvey Villneff. He was elected to a second term as mayor in the 2014 municipal election.

Electoral record

References

External links
 

French emigrants to Canada
Progressive Conservative Party of Ontario MPPs
Conservative Party of Canada candidates for the Canadian House of Commons
Living people
Mayors of North Bay, Ontario
Year of birth missing (living people)